Crambus cockleellus is a moth in the family Crambidae. It was described by William D. Kearfott in 1908. It is found in North America, where it has been recorded from Alberta and British Columbia.

References

Crambini
Moths described in 1908
Moths of North America